Navy Federal Credit Union (or Navy Federal) is a global credit union headquartered in Vienna, Virginia, chartered and regulated under the authority of the National Credit Union Administration (NCUA). Navy Federal is the largest natural member (or retail) credit union in the United States, both in asset size and in membership. As of January 2023, Navy Federal has US$156.8 billion in assets and has 12.4 million members.

History

Navy Federal was originally incorporated on 17 January 1933 as the Navy Department Employees' Credit Union of the District of Columbia (NDCU).  Only Navy Department employees who were members of the federal employees' labor union and members of their families were eligible to join. The next year, President Roosevelt signed into law the Federal Credit Union Act, which would eventually become the basis of business for the credit union. On July 17, 1947, the credit union was granted a Federal Charter as a credit union, named Navy Department Employees Federal Credit Union (NDEFCU). It also expanded membership to include all Navy personnel in the Washington, D.C., area, both military and civilian.

In 1954, the credit union changed its charter again to open membership to Navy and Marine Corps officers everywhere, regardless of geographic location, and changed its name to Navy Federal Credit Union. Eventually, membership was opened to enlisted personnel as well. By April 1962, the credit union reached a milestone, becoming the biggest credit union in the world, a distinction which it still holds today. In 1977, the credit union moved into its current headquarters in Vienna, Virginia, eventually undergoing several major expansions of its facility there.

In 2003, the credit union opened its membership further, to include Navy contractors. There have also been several times in the credit union's history that NCUA has asked Navy Federal to merge with or absorb other credit unions that were experiencing financial or other difficulties. Members of these prior credit unions remained members of Navy Federal after the merger (following NCUA's policy of "once a member, always a member"). In September 2010, Navy Federal Credit Union announced plans to absorb/merge with USA Fed, stating that joint operations would begin 4 October 2010 under the Navy Federal banner.

In May 2008, Navy Federal Credit Union widened its membership to include the entire Department of Defense, which made eligible all active duty, retired, and reserve Army, Navy, Marine Corps, and Air Force personnel, as well as contractor and civilian personnel within the Department of Defense. In March 2013, Navy Federal Credit Union further widened its membership to include all Coast Guard members and employees as well. In 2020, Navy Federal Credit Union also expanded its membership to include Space Force members. In 2014, Navy Federal expanded its Vienna headquarters. As of January, 4,300 employees work at the Vienna location.

An increase in membership also led to two expansions: one at the credit union's Pensacola location in 2015, where Navy Federal has 8,400 employees and one at the Winchester Operations location in 2019 where Navy Federal has 2,200 employees.

As of 2021, Navy Federal is by far the largest credit union in the United States, with total assets nearly three times that of the second-largest US credit union.

Legal issues
In 2017, Navy Federal Credit Union settled a class action lawsuit over millions of unwanted phone calls, many of which had gone to individuals who were not credit union members and specifically asked not to be contacted. NFCU settled a similar class action lawsuit in 2020 over unwanted text messages, paying out $9.25 million.
In 2021, Navy Federal Credit Union settled another class action lawsuit over a non-sufficient funds fee lawsuit over breached member agreements where over 700,000 members were charged multiple insufficient funds fees.

Membership
Navy Federal's field of membership is set by the National Credit Union Administration (NCUA). As with all federally-chartered credit unions, membership in Navy Federal is limited to individuals sharing the common bond defined in its credit union charter. Membership in Navy Federal is limited to:
All Department of Defense (DoD) uniformed personnel — Army, Navy, Air Force, Space Force, and Marine Corps retirees and annuitants
All DoD reservists — Army, Navy, Air Force, and Marine Corps— regardless of drill status — retirees and annuitants
All US Coast Guard uniformed personnel — regardless of drill status — civilian employees, auxiliarists, retirees, and annuitants
All Army National Guard and Air National Guard personnel — regardless of drill status — civilian employees, retirees, and annuitants
All DoD Officer Candidate programs: midshipmen and cadets at the United States Naval Academy, United States Military Academy, United States Air Force Academy, United States Coast Guard Academy, and the United States Merchant Marine Academy; personnel in Officer Candidate programs
All DoD current and retired civilian employees
U.S. government employees assigned to DoD installations
DoD contractors assigned to U.S. government installations
Employees of Navy Federal Credit Union
Family members, including grandparents, parents, spouses, siblings, grandchildren, cohabitants and children (including adopted, foster and stepchildren).
All Honorably Discharged Veterans

Organization
Navy Federal is chartered with NCUA as a single-sponsor credit union, with its sponsor being the Department of Defense.  Like all credit unions, Navy Federal is governed by a board of volunteers, elected by and from its membership. Navy Federal also has a separate subsidiary, named Navy Federal Financial Group, which operates as a credit union service organization (CUSO). CUSOs were established by NCUA as a way for credit unions to pursue product offerings that would normally be outside of the purview of a credit union.

Employees
As of January 2023, the credit union had over 22,300 employees worldwide. Navy Federal, founded in 1933, has never had a layoff, choosing instead to move employees to other departments to avoid layoffs. It was ranked number 78 on the 2008 Fortune's 100 Best Companies to Work For list, which is produced by the Great Place to Work Institute. They were 95th in 2012, rose to 56th in 2013, 96th in 2014, 72nd in 2015, 44th in 2016, 29th in 2019 19th in 2020, 59th 2021 and 76th in 2022.

Services
Navy Federal offers the typical suite of account services offered by most financial institutions, including savings accounts, checking accounts, debit cards, IRA accounts, home equity lines of credit, and certificates. The savings product is named "Share Savings" to reflect the fact that a member's initial savings deposit ($5.00) literally represents their share of ownership in the credit union.  Navy Federal also offers members consumer loans (including personal loans, auto loans, and student loans), credit cards, mortgages and home equity lines of credit, and digital banking as well as some small business services, such as PPP loans. Navy Federal's CUSO, Navy Federal Financial Group, offers more extensive investment services and related supports, financial planning, and insurance.

Due to the nature of its membership, which includes actively deployed military personnel in every time zone, Navy Federal maintains 24×7 operations at its three contact centers in Vienna, Virginia, Winchester, Virginia, and Pensacola, Florida, its largest contact center, as well as round-the-clock online banking services.

Navy Federal Investment Services, a subsidiary of Navy Federal Financial Group, launched an online investing tool called Digital Investor in January 2022.

Unlike most U.S. credit unions which generally only operate physical branches in one or a few metropolitan areas or only in a single state, Navy Federal operates branches in many U.S. metro areas as well as in some overseas locations, comprising a total of 355 branches worldwide as of October 2022. In addition, members can make transactions through the CO-OP network of more than 30,000 ATMs in the U.S. and Canada without incurring surcharges or fees.

Major banking competitors include Bank of America-Military Bank, Pentagon Federal Credit Union, and USAA.

Charitable contributions
Navy Federal Credit Union engages in multiple charitable partnerships, including a decades-long relationship with Toys for Tots, dedicated to helping families surrounding the Vienna, Virginia, headquarters, and a partnership with the National Hockey League's Stick Tap for Service Program. Navy Federal has also made multiple disaster relief donations, most recently a $100,000 donation to United Way of West Florida, to assist communities near their Pensacola, Florida offices that were adversely affected by Hurricane Sally in October 2020.

Navy Federal recently donated $100,000 through its Dollars for Doers program which, based on nominations from the credit union’s employees, awards 100 nonprofits with grants. Navy Federal donated to U.S. Vets in November 2021 in honor of Veteran’s Month. During Navy Federal’s annual drive for the Marine Toys for Tots Foundation in the 2021 holiday season, members and employees donated over $20,000 and 20,000 toys to families in need.

In 2022, Navy Federal’s members and employees donated over $33,000 and over 22,000 toys to families in need during the Toys for Tots campaigns.

Awards

Navy Federal Credit Union has received the following awards and honors:

 Rated a TrustScore of 4.7 out of 5 stars on Trustpilot.
Top Military Financial Institution by The Military Wallet
Best Mortgage Refinance Company by Money
Ranked #1 for Customer Experience Among Multichannel Banks/Credit Unions in Forrester’s 2021 US Customer Experience (CX) survey
Ranked #1 for Customer Experience Among Credit Card Issuers in Forrester’s 2021 US Customer Experience (CX) survey
Ranked "Credit Union of the Year" by United States Navy for 15th consecutive year in a row
Ranked 7th in Computerworld’s Best Places to Work in IT for 2021
Ranked 25th in “75 Best Large Workplaces for Women” list by FORTUNE in 2021
Ranked #1 for Customer Experience Among Multichannel Banks/Credit Unions in Forrester’s 2021 US Customer Experience (CX) survey
Ranked #1 for Customer Experience Among Credit Card Issuers in Forrester’s 2021 US Customer Experience (CX) survey
Received the highest score in the J.D. Power 2021 U.S. Consumer Financing Satisfaction Study
Ranked 59th in “100 Best Companies to Work For” list by FORTUNE in 2021
One of America's Best Employers for Veterans, Best Employers for Diversity, and Best Employers for New Grads by Forbes 
One of GOBankingRates Best Credit Unions of 2021
Top Credit Union by Bankrate 2022
Best Mortgage Lender by Bankrate
Top 100 Best Banks by GOBankingRates 
One of GOBankingRates Best Credit Unions of 2022
Best Home Equity Loans of 2020: Best Customer Experience by Money.com
Best Mortgage Lender by U.S. News & World Report
4th in Customer Experience Excellence by KPMG in 2020, falling from 1st in 2019
Best Overall Personal Loan of 2022 for Veterans & Military Members from Forbes 
Ranked as the 4th Top Workplace in the Washington, D.C., area by The Washington Post
Ranked #1 for Customer Experience Among Multichannel Banks/Credit Unions in Forrester’s 2022 US Customer Experience (CX) survey 
Best Auto Loans for New Car Purchase in 2022 by Bankrate
Ranked 35th in “100 Best Large Workplaces for Women” list by FORTUNE in 2022

References

External links

Credit unions based in Virginia
Companies based in Vienna, Virginia
Mutual companies of the United States
American companies established in 1933
Banks established in 1933
United States Navy